The  is a trapezoidal cemented, sand and gravel (CSG) dam on the Okukubi River in Kin, Okinawa Prefecture, Japan. Construction began in 2009 and its reservoir was filled by 31 March 2013. It is the first trapezoidal CSG-type to be constructed as a main dam in the world.

Background

Construction on the dam had originally begun in 1978. At that time, it was designed as a concrete gravity dam. Construction was halted soon after it began though. The dam was redesigned over the next few decades and after the new project was approved, preliminary construction for the dam began in late 2003. Principal construction began on March 24, 2009 and there was a groundbreaking ceremony on June 5, 2009. To divert the river, a cofferdam did not need to be constructed. On February 26, 2011, a ceremony was held to bury the cornerstone of the dam prior to beginning the fill of the dam's body. It was attended by Japanese and U.S. officials (due to the dam's location within the U.S. Marine Central Training Area). It will cost ¥3 billion (US$38.2 million) and it was completed in March 2013.

Design

The cemented, sand and gravel (CSG) design is a mixture of a concrete gravity dam and an embankment dam. Essentially, it is a sand and gravel embankment coated in concrete. This design is cheaper because it uses less fill and concrete when compared to a gravity or embankment dam. Its wide base provides the required strength while the concrete coating seals the embankment and adds to its durability. The dam's main spillway is a labyrinth weir-type over its main crest.

References

External links

Official website (Japanese)

Dams in Okinawa Prefecture
Dams completed in 2013
2013 establishments in Japan